Firuzabad District is in Chaharborj County, West Azerbaijan province, Iran. At the 2006 National Census, the region's population (as Marhemetabad-e Miyani Rural District of the former Marhemetabad District in Miandoab County) was 6,739 in 1,526 households. The following census in 2011 counted 6,839 people in 1,836 households. At the latest census in 2016, there were 6,667 inhabitants in 1,990 households. Marhemetabad District was separated from Miandoab County, elevated to the status of Chaharborj County, and divided into two districts in 2020.

References 

Districts of West Azerbaijan Province

Populated places in West Azerbaijan Province

fa:بخش فیروزآباد (چهاربرج)